Phase stretch transform (PST) is a computational approach to signal and image processing. One of its utilities is for feature detection and classification. PST is related to time stretch dispersive Fourier transform. It transforms the image by emulating propagation through a diffractive medium with engineered 3D dispersive property (refractive index). The operation relies on symmetry of the dispersion profile and can be understood in terms of dispersive eigenfunctions or stretch modes. PST performs similar functionality as phase-contrast microscopy, but on digital images. PST can be applied to digital images and temporal (time series) data. It is a physics-based feature engineering algorithm.

Operation principle
Here the principle is described in the context of feature enhancement in digital images. The image is first filtered with a spatial kernel followed by application of a nonlinear frequency-dependent phase. The output of the transform is the phase in the spatial domain. The main step is the 2-D phase function which is typically applied in the frequency domain. The amount of phase applied to the image is frequency dependent, with higher amount of phase applied to higher frequency features of the image. Since sharp transitions, such as edges and corners, contain higher frequencies, PST emphasizes the edge information. Features can be further enhanced by applying thresholding and morphological operations. PST is a pure phase operation whereas conventional edge detection algorithms operate on amplitude.

Physical and mathematical foundations of phase stretch transform
Photonic time stretch technique can be understood by considering the propagation of an optical pulse through a dispersive fiber. By disregarding the loss and non-linearity in fiber, the non-linear Schrödinger equation governing the optical pulse propagation in fiber upon integration  reduces to:

   (1)

where  = GVD parameter, z is propagation distance,  is the reshaped output pulse at distance z and time t. The response of this dispersive element in the time-stretch system can be approximated as a phase propagator as presented in 
  (2)

Therefore, Eq. 1 can be written as following for a pulse that propagates through the time-stretch system and is reshaped into a temporal signal with a complex envelope given by 

   (3)

The time stretch operation is formulated as generalized phase and amplitude operations,

    (4)

where  is the phase filter and is the amplitude filter. Next the operator is converted to discrete domain, 

     (5)

where  is the discrete frequency,  is the phase filter,   is the amplitude filter and FFT is fast Fourier transform.

The stretch operator   for a digital image is then 

     (6)

The function  is the warped phase kernel and the function  is a localization kernel implemented in frequency domain. PST operator is defined as the phase of the Warped Stretch Transform output as follows

     (7)

where is the angle operator.

PST kernel implementation
The warped phase kernel  can be described by a nonlinear frequency dependent phase

 

While arbitrary phase kernels can be considered for PST operation, here we study the phase kernels for which the kernel phase derivative is a linear or sublinear function with respect to frequency variables. A simple example for such phase derivative profiles is the inverse tangent function. Consider the phase profile in the polar coordinate system

 

From  we have 

Therefore, the PST kernel is implemented as 

 

Applications
PST has been used for edge detection in biological and biomedical images as well as synthetic-aperture radar (SAR) image processing. PST has also been applied to improve the point spread function for single molecule imaging in order to achieve super-resolution. The transform exhibits intrinsic superior properties compared to conventional edge detectors for feature detection in low contrast visually impaired images.

The PST function can also be performed on 1-D temporal waveforms in the analog domain to reveal transitions and anomalies in real time.

Open source code release
On February 9, 2016, a UCLA Engineering research group has made public the computer code for PST algorithm that helps computers process images at high speeds and "see" them in ways that human eyes cannot. The researchers say the code could eventually be used in face, fingerprint, and iris recognition systems for high-tech security, as well as in self-driving cars' navigation systems or for inspecting industrial products. The Matlab implementation for PST can also be downloaded from Matlab Files Exchange. However, it is provided for research purposes only, and a license must be obtained for any commercial applications. The software is protected under a US patent. The code was then significantly refactored and improved to support GPU acceleration. In May 2022, it became one algorithm in PhyCV: the first physics-inspired computer vision library.

See also
Edge detection
Feature detection (computer vision)
Time stretch analog-to-digital converter
Time stretch dispersive Fourier transform
Phase-stretch Adaptive Gradient-field Extractor
PhyCV

References

External links 

 Github repository for MATLAB and python implementation for PST 

Image processing
Computational physics